The third and final season of The Suite Life of Zack & Cody aired on Disney Channel from June 23, 2007 to September 1, 2008.
Zack and Cody Martin are twin brothers who move into the Tipton Hotel in Boston with their mother, Carey, where she sings and performs in the lounge. The show also centers in London Tipton, the daughter of the hotel owner, who is very wealthy and ditzy, the hotel's down-to-earth candy-counter girl, Maddie Fitzpatrick, and Mr. Moseby, the strict, dutiful, and serious manager, who is often the foil to Zack and Cody's schemes and has a liking to the piano, pocket hankies and ballet.

The returning recurring characters who were introduced in previous seasons, include: Adrian R'Mante as Esteban, Brian Stepanek as Arwin, Sophie Oda as Barbara, Aaron Musicant as Lance, Sammi Hanratty as Holly, Bo Crutcher as Skippy, Tyler Steelman as Mark, Charlie Stewart as Bob, Robert Torti as Kurt, Brittany Curran as Chelsea, Patrick Bristow as Patrick, Camilla & Rebecca Rosso as Jessica and Janice, Anthony Acker as Norman, Sharon Jordan as Irene, Marianne Muellerleile as Sister Dominick, Jerry Kernion as Chef Paolo, Ernie Grunwald as Mr. Forgess, Kaycee Stroh as Leslie and Alexa Nikolas as Tiffany. After being absent in season two and in almost every season three episode, Estelle Harris returns in the series finale as Muriel. 

Alongside the old recurring cast there are also new characters introduced: Giovonnie Samuels as Nia Moseby, Kara Taitz as Millicent, Cierra Ramirez as Jasmine, Hannah Leigh Dworkin as Amy, Jaelin Palmer as Leah, Jareb Dauplaise as Wayne and Tara Lynne Barr as Haley. 

Not returning for this season are the following cast members: Monique Coleman as Mary Margaret, Alyson Stoner as Max, Allie Grant as Agnes, Vanessa Hudgens as Corrie, Dennis Bendersky as Tapeworm, Gus Hoffman as Warren and Caroline Rhea as Ilsa.

Special guest stars and notable appearances in this season include: Michael Clarke Duncan as Coach Little, Meaghan Jette Martin as Stacey, Mark Indelicato as Antonio, Kathy Najimy as Principal Milletidge, Kay Panabaker as Amber, Tony Hawk as himself, Jaden Smith as Travis, Drew Seeley as Geoffrey, Kelsey Chow as Dakota, Daniella Monet as Dana, Chris Brown as himself, The Cheetah Girls as themselves and Nicole Sullivan as Miss Klotz.

Plot
In the season premiere, Cody graduates from Buckner Middle School, however Zack has to go to summer school because he failed English but ends up being the best in class. Cody searches for a summer job and ends up working at Paul Revere Mini Mart, which is managed by Wayne Wormser. Maddie becomes a camp counselor and finds that she needs to spend the summer with a group of juvenile girls including Holly, the little con-artist and hustler from the season two episode "Have a Nice Trip". London Tipton gets a summer romance with the hotel employee Lance, despite her rich friends not being supportive of the couple since he isn't rich like them and constantly embarrasses her. He ends up breaking up with her before the end of the summer after meeting someone else. Mr. Moseby's niece, Nia replaces Maddie in the hotel candy-counter and becomes friends with Zack, Cody and London. Once summer is over, Zack, Cody, London (who was expelled from Our Lady of Perpetual Sorrow Catholic School for skipping school), Nia, Barbara, Bob and Mark join Cheevers High School and end up getting in trouble on the first day. After being away in Antarctica, Maddie returns and also joins Cheevers High School. In the beginning she doesn't get along with Nia. London starts a web show titled "Yay Me! Starring London Tipton", produced by Cody and eventually Maddie too. 
In the episode "Let Us Entertain You" the SS Tipton is first introduced when Zack and Cody get an offer to stay at the King Neptune suite if Carey accepts to sing at the cruise. This ship will be the new main setting in the Suite Life spin-off The Suite Life on Deck. In the series finale, we finally get to know why Muriel disappeared during seasons two and three: she had been retired for a few years. 
This season also includes an episode titled "Lip Synchin' in the Rain" that aired in the same night as High School Musical 2 and is about a school production of High School Musical.

Theme song and opening sequence
The theme song is the same as in previous seasons, with the opening sequence replacing a few scenes with new ones from season three.

Cast

Main cast 
 Dylan Sprouse as Zack Martin
 Cole Sprouse as Cody Martin
 Brenda Song as London Tipton
 Ashley Tisdale as Maddie Fitzpatrick
 Phill Lewis as Mr. Moseby
 Kim Rhodes as Carey Martin

Special guest cast 
 Michael Clarke Duncan as Coach Little

Notable appearances 
 Meaghan Jette Martin as Stacey 
 Mark Indelicato as Antonio
 Kathy Najimy as Principal Milletidge
 Kay Panabaker as Amber
 Tony Hawk as himself
 Jaden Smith as Travis
 Drew Seeley as Geoffrey
 Kelsey Chow as Dakota
 Daniella Monet as Dana
 Chris Brown as himself
 The Cheetah Girls as themselves 
 Nicole Sullivan as Miss Klotz
 Estelle Harris as Muriel

Recurring cast 
 Brian Stepanek as Arwin Hawkhauser
 Giovonnie Samuels as Nia Moseby
 Adrian R'Mante as Esteban Ramirez
 Sophie Oda as Barbara Brownstein
 Aaron Musicant as Lance Fishman
 Sammi Hanratty as Holly
 Kara Taitz as Millicent
 Cierra Ramirez as Jasmine
 Hannah Leigh Dworkin as Amy
 Jaelin Palmer as Leah
 Jareb Dauplaise as Wayne Wormser
 Bo Crutcher as Skippy
 Tyler Steelman as Mark
 Charlie Stewart as Bob
 Robert Torti as Kurt Martin
 Brittany Curran as Chelsea
 Tara Lynne Barr as Haley
 Patrick Bristow as Patrick
 Camilla & Rebecca Rosso as Jessica and Janice
 Marianne Muellerleile as Sister Dominick
 Jerry Kernion as Chef Paolo
 Ernie Grunwald as Mr. Forgess
 Kaycee Stroh as Leslie
 Alexa Nikolas as Tiffany

Co-stars 
 Sharon Jordan as Irene
 Anthony Acker as Norman

Episodes

References

External links

 

 *
2007 American television seasons
2008 American television seasons